Paolo Mantegazza (31 October 1831 – 28 August 1910) was an Italian neurologist, physiologist, and anthropologist, noted for his experimental investigation of coca leaves into its effects on the human psyche. He was also an author of fiction.

Life

Mantegazza was born in Monza on 31 October 1831. After spending his student days at the universities of Pisa and Milan, he gained his M.D. degree at Pavia in 1854. After travelling in Europe, India and the Americas, he practised as a doctor in the Argentine Republic and Paraguay. Returning to Italy in 1858 he was appointed surgeon at Milan Hospital and professor of general pathology at Pavia. In 1870, he was nominated professor of anthropology at the Istituto di Studi Superiori, Florence. Here, he founded the first Museum of Anthropology and Ethnology in Italy, and later the Italian Anthropological Society. 

From 1865 until 1876, he was deputy for Monza in the Parliament of Italy, being elected subsequently to the Italian Senate. He became the object of fierce attacks because of the extent to which he practised vivisection. 

During a time when the popular and official science and culture in Italy were still influenced by the Roman Catholic Church, Mantegazza was a staunch liberal and defended the ideas of Darwinism in anthropology, his research having helped to establish it as the "natural history of man". From 1868 to 1875 he maintained a correspondence with Charles Darwin, too. 

Mantegazza's natural history, however, must be considered to be from a racial or social Darwinist perspective, evident in his Morphological Tree of Human Races. This tree maps three principles: a single European meta-narrative controls all of the world's many cultures; human history is imagined as progressive, with the European human as the pinnacle of progress and development; lastly, a ranking of different races onto a hierarchical structure. If one envisions a tree, the Aryan race is the topmost branch, followed by Polynesians, Semites, Japanese, and moving downward to the bottom-most branch, the "Negritos."  Mantegazza also designed an "Aesthetic Tree of the Human Race" with similar results.

Mantegazza believed drugs and certain foods would change humankind in the future, and defended the experimental investigation and use of cocaine as one of these miracle drugs. When Mantegazza returned from South America, where he had witnessed the use of coca by the natives, he was able to chew a regular amount of coca leaves and then tested on himself in 1859. Afterward, he wrote a paper titled Sulle Virtù Igieniche e Medicinali della Coca e sugli Alimenti Nervosi in Generale ("On the hygienic and medicinal properties of coca and on nervous nourishment in general"). He noted enthusiastically the powerful stimulating effect of cocaine in coca leaves on cognition:

"... I sneered at the poor mortals condemned to live in this valley of tears while I, carried on the wings of two leaves of coca, went flying through the spaces of 77,438 words, each more splendid than the one before...An hour later, I was sufficiently calm to write these words in a steady hand: God is unjust because he made man incapable of sustaining the effect of coca all life long. I would rather have a life span of ten years with coca than one of 10 000 000 000 000 000 000 000 centuries without coca." 

Mantegazza died at San Terenzo (La Spezia) on 28 August 1910.

Works

Mantegazza's published works also included: 
 Fisiologia del Dolore (Physiology of Pain, 1880); 
 Fisiologia dell'Amore (Physiology of Love, 1896); 
 Elementi d'igiene (Elements of Hygiene, 1875);
 Fisonomia e Mimica (Physiognomy and Mimics, 1883); 
 Gli Amori degli Uomini (The Sexual Relations of Mankind, 1885);
 Fisiologia dell'odio, (Physiology of Hate, 1889); 
 Fisiologia della Donna (Physiology of Women, 1893). 

His advanced philosophical and social views were published in a 1,200-page volume in 1871, titled Quadri della Natura Umana. Feste ed Ebbrezze ("Pictures of Human Nature. Feasts and Inebriations"). Many consider this opus his masterpiece.

As a fiction writer, Mantegazza was very original. He wrote a romance on the marriage between people with disease,  Un Giorno a Madera  (1876), which made quite a sensation. Less well known is his science fiction and futuristic romance L'Anno 3000 (The Year 3000, written in 1897).

He also wrote the novel Testa ("Head", 1887), a sequel of renowned book Heart, by his friend Edmondo de Amicis. The novel tells the story of Enrico in his teenager years.

Bibliography
 Mantegazza, P.: L'Anno 3000. Milano, 1897. (in Italian: Zipped RTF full text from Nigralatebra, or HTML full text with concordance from IntraText Digital Library).
 Mantegazza, P.: The Year 3000. A Dream. Edited, with an introduction and notes, by Nicoletta Pireddu. Transl. by David Jacobson. Lincoln: University of Nebraska Press, 2010.
 Mantegazza, P.: Fisiologia da Mulher. (in Portuguese) translated by Cândido de Figueiredo. Lisbon, Livraria Clássica Editora, 1946.
 Mantegazza, P.: The Physiology of Love and Other Writings. Edited, with an introduction and notes, by Nicoletta Pireddu. Transl. by David Jacobson. Toronto: University of Toronto Press, 2007.
 Mantegazza, P.: Un Giorno a Madera. (in Italian: HTML full text with concordance from IntraText Digital Library).
 Mantegazza, P.: Studi sui Matrimoni Consanguini. (in Italian: HTML full text with concordance from IntraText Digital Library).
 The Darwin-Mantegazza Correspondence. The Darwin Correspondence On-Line Database.
Giovanni Landucci, Darwinismo a Firenze. Tra scienze e ideologia (1860-1900), Firenze, Olschki 1977, chapters 4 and 5.
Giovanni Landucci, L'occhio e la mente. Scienza e filosofia nell'Italia dell'Ottocento, L. Olschki, Firenze 1987, ch. 3.  - 
 McClintock, Anne.  Imperial Leather: Race, Gender, and Sexuality in the Colonial Context.  New York, Routledge, 1995.
Paola Govoni, Un pubblico per la scienza. La divulgazione scientifica nell'Italia in formazione, Roma, Carocci, 2002, ch. 5 "Paolo Mantegazza. I rischi della divulgazione" - 
 Nicoletta Pireddu, Antropologi alla corte della bellezza. Decadenza ed economia simbolica nell'Europa fin de siècle, Fiorini, 2000, ch. 2 "Ethnos/Hedone/Ethos: Paolo Mantegazza, antropologo delle passioni - 

References

Further reading

Garbarino C; Mazzarello P. (2013). A strange horn between Paolo Mantegazza and Charles Darwin. Endeavour 37 (3): 184-187.

External links
 
 
 
 www.paolomantegazza.it The full text Quadri della natura umana. Feste ed ebbrezze''
 Paolo Mantegazza on the power of coca. Cocaine.org.

1831 births
1910 deaths
Italian anthropologists
Italian medical writers
Italian neuroscientists
Italian physiologists
People from Brianza
People from Monza